Ryheem Leonard Cole Sheckleford (born 20 May 1997) is an English professional footballer who plays as a full-back for Chesterfield.

Career

Fulham
Sheckleford joined the academy at Fulham in 2011. He progressed quickly through the academy, making his debut for the under-18s as a 15-year-old. He was part of the team that reached the FA Youth Cup final in 2014, and went on to captain the under-18 side. In October 2014, he signed his first professional contract on a two-year deal. This was extended for another year in summer 2016. In November 2016, he joined Wealdstone on loan, where he played 13 times in all competitions. Fulham released Sheckleford at the end of the 2016-17 season.

Maidenhead United
Sheckleford was without a club in the 2017-18 season, though he did play on trial at Bolton Wanderers in April 2018. He signed for Maidenhead United in August 2018, but spent most of the season out on loan at Walton Casuals. After a brief return on loan to Casuals at the start of the following season, Sheckleford returned to the Magpies and established himself as first choice right-back, holding down his spot in the side for the next three seasons. He left the Magpies in June 2022 after turning down a new deal. In total, he played 93 games for the Berkshire club.

Chesterfield
Sheckleford signed for Chesterfield on a two-year deal in June 2022.

Career statistics

References

1997 births
Living people
Black British sportspeople
Footballers from Lewisham
English footballers
Fulham F.C. players
Wealdstone F.C. players
Maidenhead United F.C. players
Walton Casuals F.C. players
Chesterfield F.C. players
National League (English football) players
Southern Football League players
Association football defenders